Éric Nzikwinkunda (born 1 January 1997) is an Burundian middle-distance runner who competed at the 2020 Summer Olympics.

Career
After reaching the semi-finals of the 2019 African Games in Rabat, Nzikwinkunda was selected to compete in the 800 metres at the 2020 Summer Olympics, in which he finished sixth in his qualifying heat in a time of 1.47:97. Nzikwinkunda took part in the 2022 World Athletics Indoor Championships in Belgrade, Serbia finishing fifth in his 1500m heat.

Personal life
He is based in Penyeta Roja in the province of Castellón in Spain along with his Burundi compatriots Thierry Ndikumwenayo and Rodrigue Kwizera.

References

1997 births
Living people
Burundian male middle-distance runners
Olympic athletes of Burundi
Athletes (track and field) at the 2020 Summer Olympics
African Games competitors for Burundi
Athletes (track and field) at the 2019 African Games
21st-century Burundian people